Bugungu Airstrip is an airport serving the Bugungu Wildlife Reserve in the Murchison Falls National Park (MFNP), in Uganda.

Location
The airstrip is located within Bugungu Wildlife Reserve, in Buliisa District, in the Western Region of Uganda, within the confines of the MFNP.

The geographical coordinates of Bugungu Airstrip are: 02°12'10.0"N, 31°33'16.0"E (Latitude:2.202778; Longitude:31.554444).

Overview
Bugungu Airstrip receives daily domestic flights from Entebbe International Airport and Kajjansi Airfield, which are primarily used by tourists to visit Murchison Falls National Park, as well as connecting to Kidepo Valley National Park and Queen Elizabeth National Park.

The airstrip is managed by the Uganda Wildlife Authority, under license by the Uganda Civil Aviation Authority.

Airlines and destinations

See also
Transport in Uganda
List of airports in Uganda

References

External links
 OurAirports - Bugungu
 Geoview - Bugungu
 Murchison Falls National Park
 MFNP Birding

Airports in Uganda
Buliisa District
Transport in Uganda